Khersabad may refer to:
 Khersabad-e Bozorg
 Khersabad-e Jafari